Clean Air Law of Iran was enacted on July 16, 2017. The law introduces heavier punishments and fines for any industries or individuals that do not adhere to the pollution limits. The act singles out inefficient vehicles, substandard fuels, industrial activities and dust storms as the major sources of air pollution in the country. 20 government agencies are committed to execute this law.

See also 

 Department of Environment of Iran

References

Further reading

External links 

 

Environment of Iran